Kog is a village in Slovenia.

KOG may refer to:
 KOG Studios, a South Korean company that specializes in developing online role-playing games
 Kokomo Opalescent Glass Works, an American manufacturer of glass
 Kongsberg Gruppen (ticker symbol: KOG), a Norwegian defense contractor and maritime automation supplier
 KOG (AM), an AM radio station (originally KZC) licensed from 1921 to 1923

See also 
 Cog (disambiguation)